Erol Şafak Sezer (born 10 October 1970) is a Turkish actor who usually appears in comedic roles.

His stage debut came in Haldun Taner's play Eşeğin Gölgesi at Ankara Halk Tiyatrosu (Ankara People's Theatre). He acted in several other plays at the same venue as well as at Ankara Ekin Tiyatrosu (Ankara Crop Theatre).

In cinema, he initially appeared in supporting roles in several movies. His breakthrough came with Kolpaçino (2009) in which he starred.

Şafak Sezer was found guilty of physically attacking a camera assistant for "making noise" on the set of Alemin Kralı TV series in 2012, and a 13-month prison sentence was demanded for him in December 2013. The announcement of the verdict was postponed to a later date.

Sezer rose once again to public's attention in 2013 when he publicly knelt in front of Turkey's Prime Minister and apologized for his earlier participation in protest demonstrations. Turkish newspapers reported, with accompanying photographs, on 22 July 2013 that at a Ramadan dinner hosted by the ruling AKP party on the previous evening, Sezer went to Prime Minister Recep Tayyip Erdoğan's table and went down on his knees in front of Erdoğan and apologized for his participation in a street demonstration protesting a police crackdown ordered by the government on environmentalists in Istanbul in the previous weeks.

Filmography

 Bir Düğün Masalı (1993) Lawyer Adnan
 Televizyon Çocuğu (1996) (Guest appearance)
 Baskül Ailesi (TV series) (1997) Maşallah	
 Dostlar Pasajı (TV series) (1997) Yıldırım
 Komşu Komşu (TV series) (1997) (Guest appearance)
 Sıdıka (TV series) (1997) Kenar
 Şafak Vakti (TV series) (1997) (Konuk oyuncu)
 Vizontele (2000) Veli
 Oyunbozan (2000) Police
 Reyting Hamdi (TV series) (2000) Şafak
 Bu Film Bitmez (2001)
 Zalim (TV series) (2002) (Guest appearance)	
 Rus Gelin (2002) Ökkeş
 Ekmek Teknesi (2002) Bahtiyar
 Hababam Sınıfı Merhaba (2003) Ercüment
 G.O.R.A (2004) Kuna
 Hababam Sınıfı Askerde (2004) Ercüment
 Simbiyotik (2004)
 Altın Kafes (TV series) (2004) Fuzili
 Hababam Sınıfı 3,5 (2005) Ercüment 
 Maskeli Beşler İntikam Peşinde (2005) Tezcan
 Bendeniz Aysel (Dizi) (2005) Aslan
 Ah Polis Olsam (Dizi) (2006) Rıfat / Komiser Yardımcısı
 Maskeli Beşler: Irak (2006) Tezcan
 Düş Yakamdan (TV series) (2007) Süleyman
 Kutsal Damacana (2007) Fikret
 Fesupanallah (TV series) (2007) Cesur
 Maskeli Beşler: Kıbrıs (2008) Tezcan
 Yaşar Ne Yaşar Ne Yaşamaz (Television film) (2008)
 Kadri'nin Götürdüğü Yere Git (2008) Kadri
 Aynadaki Düşman (TV series) (2009) Çelebi
 Kolpaçino (2009) Özgür
 Kutsal Damacana 2: İtmen (2009) Fikret
 Hanımeli Sokağı (TV series) (2009) Ramazan
 Türk Malı (2010) Erman Kuzu
 Memlekette Demokrasi Var (2010) Jandarma
 Kolpaçino Bomba (2011) Özgür
 Alemin Kıralı (TV series) (2011) Aslan Kıral
 Memlekette Demokrasi Var (2011)
 G.D.O. KaraKedi (2013) Gürkan
 Altındağlı (2013) Ekrem Altındağlı
 Ah Polis Olsam Yeniden (TV series) (2014) Komiser
 Şimdi Onlar Düşünsün (2014–2015) Aziz Keklik
 O Ses Türkiye New Year Program (2015)
 Kolpaçino 3. Devre (2016) Özgür
 Bir Baba Hindu (2016)
 Türk Malı Aile Komedisi (2017)
 Ketenpere (2017)
 Gürbüz: Hadi Allah'a Emanet (2018)
 Göktaşı (2018)
 Yalan Dolan'' (2019)

References

External links
 

1970 births
Living people
Turkish comedians
Turkish male film actors
Turkish male stage actors
Turkish male television actors
Male actors from Ankara
21st-century Turkish male actors
20th-century Turkish male actors